Si Phang Nga National Park is in Phang Nga Province in southern Thailand, covering the eastern parts of the districts Khura Buri and Takua Pa.

The landscape of the park is dominated by rugged mountains covered with dipterocarp forests, similar to the Khao Sok adjoining it to the east.

The establishment of the park was announced in the Royal Gazette, Issue 105, Chapter 60 of 16 April 1988.

The park occupies an area of 153,800 rai ~ .

See also
List of national parks of Thailand
List of Protected Areas Regional Offices of Thailand

References

External links

 Si Phang Nga National Park Birding 
 Department of National Parks, Wildlife and Plant Conservation

Geography of Phang Nga province
National parks of Thailand
Protected areas established in 1988
Tenasserim Hills
Tourist attractions in Phang Nga province
1988 establishments in Thailand